Britain's Imperial Air Routes, 1918 to 1939: The Story of Britain's Overseas Airlines is a book by Robin Higham telling the history of the first twenty years of British air transport with an emphasis on the story of Imperial Airways and its predecessors. The book was first published by G. T. Foulis in 1960, with a revised version published by Fonthill in 2016.

In the book, Higham writes about the experience in Britain of connecting the British Empire via commercial flight, during the interwar years. From 1921 to 1924 British air transport companies were able to obtain subsidies from government and from 1924 increasing amounts were given to Imperial Airways. The book contains total British subsidies to air transport companies and traces air routes to Africa, Australia, India and North America.

First edition
Britain's Imperial Air Routes, 1918 to 1939, written by Robin Higham, was first published by G. T. Foulis in 1960, and focusses on the first twenty years of British air transport, Imperial Airways and its predecessors. Funded by the research council of the North Carolina State University, Higham's studies traced air routes to Africa, Australia, India and North America. 

In the book, Higham writes about the experience in Britain of connecting the British Empire via commercial flight, during the interwar years. It includes issues surrounding securing flying routes and landing rights, if and how civil aviation should be subsidized, and how it should be operated. The book begins with the story of four British companies. From 1921 to 1924 British air transport companies were able to obtain subsidies from government and from 1924 increasing amounts were given to Imperial Airways.

The book contains total British subsidies to air transport companies such as that for the Cairo to Karachi service, a weekly service by 1930 that Samuel Hoare had previously gained government financial assistance for when he was Secretary of State for Air. In his research, Higham studied the papers of George Woods Humphery, Imperial Airway's managing director, and showed previously unpublished accounts of 1922–23 of Daimler Airway. Debates in parliament are included. Higham explains in the book that from the late 1920s Imperial and KLM extended their international air links to serve their countries' respective colonial interests while the US Pan Am was developing intercontinental routes into South America.

Revised edition

A revised version was published in 2016, by Fonthill. Covering 349 pages, the book contains 26 chapters, an introductory publisher's note, eight appendices, and endnotes. The book begins with a map of the India to Australia route between Karachi and Singapore, operated by Imperial Airways and India Trans-Continental Airways, and east of Singapore by Qantas Empire Airways, both in association with Imperial Airways, and ends with a bibliography, but without an index. There are 74 photographs occupying the centre pages, and a few further route maps interspersed on other pages, as well as several tables explaining costs.

Reviews
In 1961, a review in the Journal of the Royal Aeronautical Society noted that despite some minor errors, the book to be a good summary of the first 20 years of British air transport and was based on much research. The review felt that Higham placed too much emphasis on government and not enough on the terrain where the route surveys were done. In Business History Review , the book was described as revealing the intermingling of business operations and public policy, and revealing that Higham felt that the British government had not handled the issue of commercial aviation effectively. The Journal of Modern History described the book as a "competent" study and hoped that a similar study of the history of civil aviation in the United States might be produced.

According to a doctoral thesis from Sheffield Hallam University in 2014, the original book was the official account of the study of the air route to India for over 50 years.

Illustrations
Photographs in the book include Alcock and Brown and the world's first airline steward Jack Sanderson. The book also includes photographs of the chairmen and directors of Imperial Airways such as Sir Eric Geddes, Sir George Beharrel and George Woods Humphery, and several aircraft.

Versions
First: 
Revised:

References

History books about the British Empire
1960 non-fiction books
Imperial Airways
Aviation books
History of aviation